Corvinus University of Budapest is a university in Budapest, Hungary. The university currently has an enrolment of approximately 9,600 students, with a primary focus on business administration, economics, and social sciences, operating in Budapest and Székesfehérvár since 1948. Corvinus University accepts students at six faculties and offer courses leading to degrees at the bachelor, master and doctoral level in specialisations taught in Hungarian, English, French or German.

The university was listed in the top 50 in the Financial Times European Masters in Management rankings, and was the first Hungarian university mentioned among the best in the area of agriculture.

Considered to be one of the most prestigious and selective universities in Hungary, Corvinus alumni include a former prime minister of Hungary as well as various government ministers, governors of the Hungarian National Bank, and leading business figures.

History
In 1846, József Industrial School opened its gates with departments for economics and trade for upper grade students. The immediate forerunner of the Corvinus University of Budapest, the Faculty of Economics of the Royal Hungarian University, was established in 1920. The faculty was an independent organization that was granted the same status as faculties of other universities.

In 1934, the faculty was merged with other institutions including the University of Technology to form the Hungarian Royal Palatine Joseph University of Technology and Economics. Modern economist training began in 1948, when the Hungarian University of Economics was established as a separate universitas. Since then, the institution has undergone multiple name changes. In 1953 it was renamed Karl Marx University of Economic Sciences. In 1990 the political system changed in Hungary. After 43 years democratic and free parliamentary elections were held. Following that the name of the university was changed to the University of Economics of Budapest.

In 2000, with the integration of the College of Public Administration, the institution was named Budapest University of Economic Sciences and Public Administration (BUESPA). The College of Public Administration was founded in 1977.

In 2003, the three faculties of the former University of Horticulture (then part of the Szent István University) were integrated into the BUESPA. The first predecessor of the horticulture faculties, the School for practical Gardening (1853–1860) was the first institution of horticultural professional training in Hungary. The school was founded and managed by the horticultural scholar and publicist Dr Ferenc Entz (1805–1877), who was also a corresponding member of the Hungarian Academy of Sciences (HAS).
In 1939 an independent Royal Horticultural Academy was launched. It included three departments: agriculture, horticulture and landscape architecture. The latter was one of a kind in Hungary at the time.

In 2004, the university received its present name.
The name the Corvinus University of Budapest refers to the name of Corvinae (codices). Bibliotheca Corviniana was one of the most renowned libraries of the Renaissance world, established in the 15th century by King Matthias Corvinus of Hungary.

The Faculty of Public Administration was appended to the newly formed National University of Public Service on January 1, 2012.

From 2013 Corvinus University of Budapest offered a Summer School program.

In February 2019, the government announced that it would place Corvinus University under the newly created Maecenas Universitatis Corvini Foundation from July 2019. The foundation will be allocated 10% of the government's stake in MOL and Gedeon Richter worth HUF 380 billion at the time, with the operational expenses to be paid with the dividends from these companies. For all intents and purposes, the university will become independent of the government.

The new appointed rector became Előd Takáts on 1 August 2021, parallel with the change of control of the university, replacing András Lánczi after his six-year term.

Faculties and training programmes
At the Corvinus University, 11,500 students are enrolled in bachelor's, master's, single-cycle, postgraduate specialisation and doctoral programmes.

The teaching activities previously organised under the faculties have been restructured for the 2019/20 academic year and have become institutionalised. Under the direction of the institutes, training is divided into departments.
 Institute of Economics and Public Policy
 Institute of Informatics
 Institute of Economics
 Institute of Communication and Sociology
 Institute of Marketing
 Institute of Mathematics and Statistical Modelling
 MNB Institute
 Institute of International, Political and Regional Studies
 Institute of Finance, Accounting and Business Law
 Institute of Business Economics
 Institute for the Development of Enterprises
 Institute of Management

Setting and architecture

The university is in an urban setting. The faculties operate in multiple buildings that stand in the city centre of Budapest.

The university's main building – now part of the UNESCO Heritage Site – is located in Pest on the left bank of the Danube, next to the Great Market Hall and facing the Budapest University of Technology and Economics on the river's other bank. The main building was planned by Miklós Ybl as the Main Customs Office in Neo-Renaissance style. It was finished in 1874. The building was called "Vámház" (Customs House) and "Fővámpalota" (Chief Customs Palace). This is also the name of the nearby avenue. The building was connected to ports of the Danube by four tunnels. It had a railroad connection. During WW2 the Hungarian, German and Soviet troops used the building as a military base. The Customs House suffered serious damage during the war. In 1948 it became the main building of the University of Economics. It underwent major renovations in 1950 and later in 1989–1990.

Much of the education of the business faculties (Faculty of Business Administration, Economics, Social Sciences) takes place in the main building. This is the location of the rector's offices as well.

The university's Közraktár Street building was completed in 2007. It offers  of floor space, which includes an office building and education areas. The building has community areas, and hosts the 450-seat central library of the university which contains 100,000 books and journals.

Research
The Regional Centre for Energy Policy Research was established in 2004. The three main pillars of the Research Centre are education, research and consultancy. Their analysis focuses mainly on electricity and natural gas markets. They have been working on water management issues since 2007 and on transport issues since 2017.

In 2018, the Corvinus Institute for Advanced Studies (CIAS), an international research centre, was established to strengthen Corvinus' scientific performance and international embeddedness. There are more than 20 research centres operating besides them at the university.

Several research-related journals (Society and Economy, Vezetéstudomány [Management], Corvinus Journal of Sociology and Social Policy, Corvinus Journal of International Affairs,  and Köz-Gazdaság [Public Economy]) and publications (e.g. workshop series: Corvinus Economic Working Papers RePEc, and Corvinus Law Papers) are published by the university.

Doctoral schools
At Corvinus University of Budapest, doctoral studies currently cover seven fields of study:

 Doctoral School of Business and Management
 Doctoral School of Economics and Business Informatics
 Doctoral School of International Relations and Political Science
 Doctoral School of Sociology and Communication Science
The majority of courses are taught in English due to the growing internationalisation process based on an increasing number of foreign students.

Awards and rankings

In 2010, Corvinus won the Higher Education Quality Award in the Higher Education Institutions category. Its business majors are not only among the leading universities in Hungary, but are also internationally recognised: the university was ranked first in the region in 2019 by Eduniversal and second in 2020, and in 2019 it was ranked among the 100 best business schools in Europe by the Financial Times, while the university's master's degree in Regional and Environmental Management was ranked 36th in the category of Sustainable Development and Environmental Management, also by Eduniversal.

Specialised colleges

The specialised colleges conduct in-depth research on a number of specialised subjects (e.g. social theory and finance), sometimes with the involvement of external academics or economic operators. Members usually live together on a separate floor of their university hall of residence or in a separate building. This promotes active community life and shared learning and research.[7]

The most significant of the university's specialised colleges in 2020 are:

 Rajk László College for Advanced Studies
 Széchenyi István College for Advanced Studies
 College for Advanced Studies in Social Theory (Társadalomelméleti Kollégium, TEK)
 EVK College for Advanced Studies
 Heller Farkas College for Advanced Studies
 Society of Young Autonomous Economists (FAKT)
 College for Advanced Studies of Diplomacy in Practice (GyDSz)
 Mathias Corvinus Collegium
 Szent Ignác Jesuit Specialised College
 Specialised College of Practical Diplomacy

Student organisations
In addition to the specialised colleges, Corvinus has more than 40 student organisations, making it the most active organised student life in the country. Some organisations have a professional focus, others are organised around a hobby, or internationalisation, etc.[8]

Notable alumni
 Sándor Csányi – chairman of OTP Bank, owner of Bonafarm, investor, philanthropist, billionaire, the richest person in Hungary (according to Forbes)
 Gordon Bajnai – former prime minister of Hungary
 Sebastian Gorka – American military and intelligence analyst
 György Surányi – former governor of the National Bank of Hungary
Fanny von Hann-Kende – physician and psychoanalyst
 Ákos Kovács – singer, one of the best-selling artists in Hungary
 Zoltán Kovács (born 1962), vice-president of the Hungarian Ice Hockey Federation and Paul Loicq Award recipient
 Lajos Bokros – former minister of finance, chairman of Budapest Stock Exchange
 Dávid Korányi – director at Atlantic Council
 József Váradi – CEO of Wizz Air
 György Matolcsy – governor of the National Bank of Hungary since 2013
 François Lumumba – Congoloese politician

See also
 Open access in Hungary

Notes

References

External links
 MBA Programme Website of Corvinus University, School of Management
 History of Corvinus University in English
 Scientific Journal of the Faculty of Economics
International Economy and Business Programme

 
Business schools in Hungary
Educational institutions established in 1920
1920 establishments in Hungary
Universities of economics in Europe